The Grotta di Ispinigoli is a karst cave in the Supramonte range, near Dorgali, Sardinia, Italy.

Overview
One of the largest caves on the island, it contains the tallest column, the tallest in Europe and one of the tallest in the world, measuring circa 38 m in total. The cave also includes the so-called Abisso delle Vergini ("Abyss of the Virgins"), a c. 60 m-deep hole leading to a 12 km series of caves connecting Ispingoli to San Giovanni su Anzu cave. Inside the cave were found traces of human bones and jewelry dating back the Bronze Age, the site was used as burial place by the Nuragic people.

At the bottom of the abyss, were found traces of the extinct giant otter Megalenhydris. This animal is one of four species of extinct endemic otters on the island.

See also
Bue Marino Grotto
Tiscali Cave
List of caves
List of caves in Italy

External links
Page about the grottoes 

Ispingoli
Landforms of Sardinia
Ispinigoli
Ispingoli
Province of Nuoro